Barbatula nuda is a species of ray-finned fish in the genus Barbatula.

Footnotes 

 

nuda
Fish described in 1864